The Vandalia Gathering is a popular festival devoted to old-time and bluegrass music, as well as related arts such as dance, quilt making, and cooking, which takes place each summer on the state capitol grounds in Charleston, West Virginia, United States. It was established in 1977. It is held on Memorial Day weekend in May. The festival features solo competitions, whose winners are awarded cash prizes.

Performers at the festival have included Lester McCumbers, Dwight Diller, Ginny Hawker and Tracy Schwarz, and Everett Lilly and the Lilly Mountaineers.

There was no gathering in 2020 as officials cited the COVID-19 pandemic as grounds for cancellation.

Vandalia Award
The Vandalia Award is an honor given by the West Virginia Department of Arts, Culture and History to recognize individuals "for their lifetime contribution to West Virginia and its traditional culture." The annual Vandalia Award ceremony occurs at the start of summer and typically on Memorial Day weekend, and held at the Normal L. Fagan State Theater at the West Virginia Culture Center in Charleston.

See also 
List of bluegrass music festivals

References

External links
Official site

Folk festivals in the United States
Festivals in West Virginia
Old-time music festivals
Bluegrass festivals
Charleston, West Virginia
Tourist attractions in Kanawha County, West Virginia
Music festivals established in 1977
1977 establishments in West Virginia